Francisco José Hernández Mandujano (December 7, 1945 – March 29, 1989), better known as Chico Che, was a musician, singer, songwriter, and performer from Villahermosa, Tabasco, Mexico.

Born in 1945, Chico Che was the youngest of three. At the age of 5, he began playing a guitar given to him by his cousin, Lolita Mandujano. Though he never received formal training, he mastered the guitar and numerous other instruments. Throughout his career, he founded several notable groups including Los 7 Modernistas, Los Temerarios, and La Crisis. Among his hit songs were "De Quén Chon" and "Quién Pompó".

In 1968, Chico Che married Concepcion Rodriguez and the couple had three children. On March 29, 1989, Chico Che died of a heart attack at his home in Mexico City. He was 43.

External links
 Article about his life

1940 births
1989 deaths
Mexican musicians
People from Villahermosa
20th-century Mexican male singers